Sulconazole (trade name Exelderm) is an antifungal medication of the imidazole class.  It is available as a cream or solution to treat skin infections such as athlete's foot, ringworm, jock itch, and sun fungus. Although not used commercially for insect control, sulconazole nitrate exhibits a strong anti-feeding effect on the keratin-digesting Australian carpet beetle larvae Anthrenocerus australis.

References 

CYP2D6 inhibitors
Thioethers
Imidazole antifungals
Lanosterol 14α-demethylase inhibitors